Grigore T. Popa University of Medicine and Pharmacy (or UMF Iași) is a public university-level medical school located in Iași, Romania. Named in honor of the scientist Grigore T. Popa, it is classified by the Ministry of Education as an advanced research and education university.

History

Romania has a long-standing tradition in the medical field. The Romanian health care system has been in existence since the 18th century, St. Spiridon Hospital (1757), in Iași, being the oldest in the historical region of Moldavia, and one of the largest in Romania.

On 30 November 1859, Surgery School of Iași was inaugurated in the Academia Mihăileană building. Founded by Nicolae Negură, it was the first Romanian language higher learning medical school in Romania.

Iași University of Medicine and Pharmacy, as one of the oldest educational places in Romania, was established on 30 September 1879, as the Faculty of Medicine, incorporated in the University of Iași.

In 1948, the Medical School was associated with the School of Pharmacy and the School of Dentistry to form together the Institute of Medicine and Pharmacy (renamed, in 1991, "Grigore T. Popa" University of Medicine and Pharmacy).

Structure

The University is a complex higher education institution, comprising four divisions: Medicine, Pharmacy, Dentistry and Biomedical Engineering. In addition, it is home to eight colleges (General Nursing, Dental Technique, Dental Nursing, Audiology, Balneotherapy and Rehabilitation, Medical Cosmetics, Hygiene and Public Health, Pharmaceutical Technique). Colleges hold three-year-courses. Students are required to pass a license examination upon completion of their studies.
The Medicine and Dentistry courses both last six years.

Conferences

Grigore T. Popa University of Medicine and Pharmacy organizes various conferences throughout the academic year.

Congressis
Congressis is a medical students and young doctors conference (organised in April), focusing on Fundamental Sciences, Surgery, Internal Medicine and Bioethics.
It is one of the most popular congresses in Romania, as it has one of the largest participations of all the medical students conferences organized throughout the country.
The official language of the Congress, is English.

Affiliations
Grigore T. Popa University of Medicine and Pharmacy has adopted the ECTS grading scale since the academic year 1998–1999. 
It is affiliated with the following educational institutions:

 University of Freiburg, Germany
 University of Lyon, France
 University of Amiens, France
 University of Amions, France
 University of Nancy, France
 University of Louvain, France
 University of Torino, Italy
 University of Parma, Italy

Hospitals Affiliations
 St. Spiridon Hospital
 St. Maria Clinic Children's Hospital
 Regional Oncology Institute
 Institute of Cardiovascular Diseases
 Socola Psychiatric University Hospital
 Parhon Hospital
 CFR Hospital
 Neurosurgery Hospital

Gallery

See also
 George Emil Palade, the 1974 Nobel Prize winner in Physiology or Medicine, born in Iași
 Nicolae Paulescu, the discoverer of insulin
 Maria Cicherschi Ropală, first female coroner in Europe
 List of Nobel Laureates in Physiology or Medicine
 Nobel Prize Controversies

References

Sources
 Grigore T. Popa University of Medicine and Pharmacy - Information Brochure

External links

 Association of Medical Students of Grigore T. Popa University of Medicine and Pharmacy 
 Congressis Official Website  - 
 Grigore T. Popa University of Medicine and Pharmacy - Official Website  - 

Educational institutions established in 1948
Medical schools in Romania
Popa
1948 establishments in Romania